Ayoub El Amloud (born 8 April 1994) is a Moroccan professional footballer who plays as a right-back for Wydad AC.

International career
He made his debut for Morocco national football team on 8 June 2021 in a friendly against Ghana. He started the game and was substituted after 86 minutes in a 1–0 win.

References

1994 births
People from Ouarzazate
Moroccan footballers
Morocco international footballers
Association football midfielders
AS FAR (football) players
Wydad AC players
Living people